The 37th Filmfare Awards were held in 1992.

Lamhe led the ceremony with 13 nominations, followed by Saajan with 11 nominations, Saudagar with 9 nominations, Henna with 8 nominations and Hum with 7 nominations.

Lamhe won 5 awards, including Best Film and Best Actress (for Sridevi), thus becoming the most-awarded film at the ceremony.

Anupam Kher received dual nominations for Best Supporting Actor for his performances in Lamhe and Saudagar, but lost to Danny Denzongpa who won the award for Sanam Bewafa.

Main awards

Best Film
 Lamhe 
Dil Hai Ke Manta Nahin
Henna
Saajan
Saudagar

Best Director
 Subhash Ghai – Saudagar 
Lawrence D'Souza – Saajan
Mahesh Bhatt – Dil Hai Ke Manta Nahin
Randhir Kapoor – Henna
Yash Chopra – Lamhe

Best Actor
 Amitabh Bachchan – Hum 
Aamir Khan – Dil Hai Ke Manta Nahin
Anil Kapoor – Lamhe
Dilip Kumar – Saudagar
Sanjay Dutt – Saajan

Best Actress
 Sridevi – Lamhe 
Dimple Kapadia – Lekin...
Madhuri Dixit – Saajan
Rekha – Phool Bane Angaray
Zeba Bakhtiar – Henna

Best Supporting Actor
 Danny Denzongpa – Sanam Bewafa 
Amrish Puri – Phool Aur Kaante
Anupam Kher – Lamhe
Anupam Kher – Saudagar
Saeed Jaffrey – Henna

Best Supporting Actress
 Farida Jalal – Henna 
Deepa Sahi – Hum
Rama Vij – Prem Qaidi
Waheeda Rehman – Lamhe

Best Comedian
 Anupam Kher – Lamhe 
Anupam Kher – Dil Hai Ke Manta Nahin
Kader Khan – Hum
Laxmikant Berde – 100 Days

Best Villain
 Sadashiv Amrapurkar – Sadak 
Amrish Puri – Saudagar
Danny Denzongpa – Hum
Om Puri – Narsimha

Best Music Director 
 Saajan – Nadeem-Shravan 
Lekin... – Hridaynath Mangeshkar
Phool Aur Kaante – Nadeem-Shravan
Saudagar – Laxmikant–Pyarelal

Best Lyricist
 Lekin... – Gulzar for Yaara Seeli Seeli 
Dil Hai Ke Manta Nahin – Faaiz Anwar for Dil Hai Ke Manta Nahin
Henna – Ravindra Jain for Main Hoon Khushrang
Lamhe – Anand Bakshi for Kabhi Main Kahoon
Saajan – Sameer for Mera Dil Bhi

Best Playback Singer, Male
 Saajan – Kumar Sanu for Mera Dil Bhi 
Hum – Sudesh Bhosle for Jumma Chumma
Lamhe – Hariharan for Kabhi Main Kahoon
Saajan – Pankaj Udhas for Jiyen to Jiyen Kaise
Saajan – S. P. Balasubramaniam for Tumse Milne Ki Tamanna Hai

Best Playback Singer, Female
 Dil Hai Ke Manta Nahin – Anuradha Paudwal for Dil Hai Ke Manta Nahin
Saajan – Alka Yagnik for Dekha Hai Pehli Baar
Saajan – Anuradha Paudwal for Bohot Pyaar Karte Hain
Saudagar – Kavita Krishnamurthy for Saudagar Sauda Kar

Best Debut
 Ajay Devgn – Phool Aur Kaante

Lux New Face of the Year
 Raveena Tandon – Patthar Ke Phool

Best Story
 Lamhe – Honey Irani 
Disha – Sai Paranjpye
Ek Doctor Ki Maut – Ramapada Choudhary
Prahaar: The Final Attack – Nana Patekar and Sujit Sen

Best Screenplay
 Ek Doctor Ki Maut – Tapan Sinha

Best Dialogue
 Lamhe – Rahi Masoom Raza

Lifetime Achievement Award

Not Awarded

Best Art Direction
 Hum

Best Choreography
 Hum – Chinni Prakash for "Jumma Chumma"

Best Cinematography
 Henna

Best Editing
 Saudagar

Best Sound
 Patthar Ke Insaan

Critics' awards

Best Film
 Diksha

Best Documentary
 Raam Ke Naam

Biggest Winners
Lamhe – 5/13
Hum – 3/7
Henna – 2/8
Saudagar – 2/9
Saajan – 2/11

References
 The Nominations – 1991 Filmfare Awards

External links
 
 https://www.imdb.com/event/ev0000245/1992/

Filmfare Awards
Filmfare